William H. Bright Jr. is the Chief Judge of the Connecticut Appellate Court.

Education

Bright earned his Bachelor of Arts from Dickinson College in 1984 and his Juris Doctor from the University of Chicago Law School in 1987.

Legal career

He was the managing partner of McCarter & English's Hartford law office and co-chair of the firm's Business Litigation practice group. He also was a shareholder in Cummings & Lockwood, a member of the firm's Board of Directors, and chair of the firm's Litigation practice group.

State court service

Bright was appointed to the  Tolland District Superior Court by Governor Jodi Rell in 2008.

Appointment to state appellate court

On October 4, 2017, Governor Dan Malloy appointed him to the Connecticut Appellate Court. He was confirmed on November 1, 2017. On April 24, 2020, Chief Justice Richard A. Robinson announced the appointment of Bright to be the next Chief Judge of the Connecticut Appellate Court, effective August 1, 2020.

References

External links
Official Biography on State of Connecticut Judicial Branch website

Living people
20th-century American lawyers
21st-century American judges
Place of birth missing (living people)
Date of birth missing (living people)
Connecticut lawyers
Dickinson College alumni
Superior court judges in the United States
University of Chicago Law School alumni
Year of birth missing (living people)